Sripathi Panditharadhyula Charan is an Indian film playback singer, actor, producer and director known for his works in Tamil cinema and Telugu cinema.

He is the son of legendary singer S. P. Balasubrahmanyam. He first worked as a playback singer in Tamil and Telugu. He ventured into acting with the 2003 Kannada film Hudugigagi and is best known for his performance in the 2008 film Saroja. He has established a film production company called Capital Film Works, and produced several Tamil films, including the cult hit Chennai 600028 in 2007 and the National Film Award-winning Aaranya Kaandam in 2012.

He is filming a new webseries in Tamil language under his home banner Capital Film Works named Adhigaram which would mark his debut as a director in the Tamil film industry. Adhigaram is an intense political thriller which touches upon sensitive issues. The release date is yet to be revealed by the crew in accordance to the pandemic situations.

Early life
Charan is the son of the late legendary singer S. P. Balasubrahmanyam and his wife Savitri. Charan, was born and raised in Chennai. SP.Charan, has 1 Elder Sister : Pallavi. She is a singer. He Studied in Asan Memorial CBSE School, Chennai in which the popular Tamil actor Ajithkumar also studied with him and was a school friend of him. He received a bachelor's degree in Business Administration from Pace University in New York, USA in 1994 and completed a two-year course in Film and Television.

Career

Director
SP Charan's Adhigaram has 10 episodes, and will be an intense political thriller. Abhirami Venkatachalam has been roped in to play one of the leads in the series. Cable Shankar has penned the script and dialogue for this web series.” Athulya Ravi will also be a part of the project. The series also features actors like Vellai Pookal Dev, Ilavarasu, AL Alagappan, John Vijay and Vinodhini in important roles. SP Charan will be producing

it under his home banner Capital Film Works.Adhigaram will feature music by Deena Devarajan with cinematography by Rajesh Yadav and editing by National Award winner Praveen K. L. The technical crew of Adhigaram also includes names like Manigi, who has come on board as the additional screenwriter and dialogue writer, followed by art direction by Remiyan, action sequences by Stunt Silva, costume designs by Sofiya Jenifer and C. Murugesh Babu serving as the script supervisor. Details on when Adhigaram will begin streaming is yet to made known with the production house expected to reveal in the days ahead.

Actor
Charan first acted with his father in a film called Maha Yedabidangi, directed by K. S. L. Swamy, but the film was not released. Balachander's son Kailasam approached him to act in the television serial Oonjal, produced by K. Balachander and directed by Sundar K. Vijayan. It was followed by Radan's Annamalai. He also starred in a TV serial named Bommaigal in Tamil and Akka Chellulu in Telugu. His first release was the Kannada film Hudugigagi in 2003, directed by B. Manjunath. In 2008, he played one of the lead roles in Venkat Prabhu's Saroja. On his performance, Sify wrote: "S.P.B Charan as Jagapathy Babu suits the role and is fantastic". He acted in Va, in which he played Shiva's prospective brother-in-law. He acted in two Tamil films Vanavarayan Vallavarayan and Vizhithiru.

Producer
Charan established the film production company Capital Film Works, in 2002. Their first production was the film Unnai Charanadainthen, in which Charan played the lead role, alongside his friend Venkat Prabhu. The film, which notably featured musical score by Charan's father, Balasubrahmanyam, received four Tamil Nadu State Film Awards. Charan revealed that he decided to produce the film after hearing Samuthirakani's narration. He further produced the Jayam Ravi-starrer Mazhai (2005), a remake of the Telugu film Varsham, which was not well received. His next production was Venkat Prabhu's directorial debut Chennai 600028 (2007), considered a trend-setting film that featured 11 newcomers in the lead and became one of 2007's biggest commercial as well as critical successes. In 2011, his sixth production Aaranya Kaandam, was released to critical acclaim and became noted for getting 52 cuts by the regional Central Board of Film Certification. Although it did not achieve the expected box office success, Charan won a Swarna Kamal at the 59th National Film Awards as a producer of the film. His next production will be Thirudan Police, by another debutant, Caarthick Raju.

Playback singer
Charan began working as a playback singer in 1997 with "Deepangal pesum" from Devathai, under Ilaiyaraaja's direction. About being the son of an icon, he stated: "my voice sounds so much like appa, people might not want to use a similar voice. When SPB himself is rocking, why would composers need his clone?" He has sung for composers M. M. Keeravani, A. R. Rahman and Devi Sri Prasad. Charan's most popular songs include "Nagila Nagila" from Alaipayuthey, "Mellaga" from Varsham, "Nenu Nenuga Lene" from Manmadhudu, "I Love you Shailaja" from Mazhai, "Please Sir" from Boys, "Maaja Maaja" from Jillunu Oru Kadhal, "Oru Nanban Irundhal" from Enakku 20 Unakku 18, "O Shanti" from Vaaranam Aayiram, "Nee Naan" from Mankatha. In 2010, he recorded a song on the Kadhal 2 Kalyanam soundtrack for Yuvan Shankar Raja and recorded with his father for the first time in Tamil for the film Aadukalam, for which they both won the Vijay Award for Best Male Playback Singer.

He is also seen singing in many of the concerts and stage shows like Cultural Exchange Program for the World Peace arranged by Balasai Baba in 2013.

He also anchored TV shows and audio launch events like Magadheera in Chennai. He has also seen performing at audio launch events Iravin Nizhal in Chennai recently in July 2022.

Personal life
In 1996, he and childhood friends Venkat Prabhu and Premgi Amaren set up a music band called Next Generation, which also had Yugendran and Thaman as members.

Charan underwent a notable weight loss in late 2010. In response to speculation, he stated it was in response to becoming health-conscious.

Filmography

As director

Television

Web series

As producer

As dubbing artist

Short film

Music videos

Show presenter / anchor

Discography

Playback singer

Tamil discography
List of Tamil songs sung by S. P. B. Charan.

Telugu discography

Hindi discography

Kannada discography

Independent songs

Awards

Live performance &  shows

References

External links
 
 

Indian male film actors
Male actors in Tamil cinema
Male actors in Kannada cinema
Film producers from Chennai
Tamil film producers
Indian male playback singers
Tamil playback singers
Telugu playback singers
Television personalities from Tamil Nadu
Male actors from Chennai
Living people
Male actors in Telugu cinema
21st-century Indian male actors
Producers who won the Best Debut Feature Film of a Director National Film Award
1972 births